The 1995 Úrvalsdeild is an season of top-flight Icelandic football.

Overview
It was contested by 10 teams, and ÍA won the championship. ÍA's Arnar Gunnlaugsson was the top scorer with 15 goals.

League standings

Results
Each team played every opponent once home and away for a total of 18 matches.

References

Úrvalsdeild karla (football) seasons
Iceland
Iceland
1995 in Icelandic football